The Shenzhen Kunlun Red Star or the Shenzhen KRS are a professional ice hockey team in the Zhenskaya Hockey League (ZhHL). They are based in Shenzhen, Guangdong, China and their home is Shenzhen Dayun Arena. 

In response to heightened entry restrictions in Russia amid the COVID-19 pandemic, the team temporarily relocated to Mytishchi, a town in Moscow Oblast, for the 2021–22 and 2022–23 seasons. Their temporary home is Mytishchi Arena, which they share with Kunlun Red Star of the Kontinental Hockey League (KHL).

The Shenzhen Kunlun Red Star were founded in 2017 and joined the Canadian Women's Hockey League (CWHL) in the 2017–18 season. During their inaugural season, they were distinguished from other Kunlun Red Star teams with the name Kunlun Red Star Women's Ice Hockey, abbreviated to Kunlun Red Star WIH. The other CWHL team in China, the Vanke Rays, merged into Shenzhen KRS in 2018, prompting the team to rebrand as the Shenzhen Kunlun Red Star Vanke Rays or Shenzhen KRS Vanke Rays ahead of the 2018–19 season. 

The Shenzhen KRS Vanke Rays joined the ZhHL ahead of the 2019–20 season, after the CWHL unexpectedly folded in 2019. In an effort to reinforce the link between the Kunlun Red Star men's and women's programs, the team returned to its original name, Shenzhen Kunlun Red Star (KRS), in 2022.

History

Canadian Women's Hockey League (CWHL): 2017–2019
The Kunlun Red Star women's ice hockey team was established on 5 June 2017, in an effort to improve the China women's national ice hockey team in preparation for the 2022 Beijing Winter Olympics, in association the Kunlun Red Star men's team that had joined the Kontinental Hockey League the previous year. The team signed two players prior to the official announcement of the team in Finnish goaltender Noora Räty and American forward Kelli Stack. Red Star announced Digit Murphy, formerly of the Boston Blades as head coach. The team also signed Rob Morgan from Yale as associate head coach but soon after became the head coach of the second Chinese team, the Vanke Rays.

With their first round pick in the 2017 CWHL Draft, the Red Star selected Noora Räty. The club proceeded to select Alexandra Carpenter in the second round, while the third round saw the franchise select National Women's Hockey League (NWHL) All-Star Shiann Darkangelo.

On 21 October 2017, the Red Star competed in their first game, facing the Markham Thunder. Kelli Stack and Baiwei Yu both earned assists on the first goal in Kunlun Red Star history, scored by Zoe Hickel. During the regular season, teams that traveled to China played a three-game series against the Red Star in an effort to reduce travel costs.

By season's end, Noora Räty was the CWHL's regular season goaltending champion, leading the league in goals against average. In addition, she tied for the league in shutouts with goaltender Emerance Maschmeyer of Les Canadiennes, with six. Räty also won the CWHL Goaltender of the Year award, the first European-born goaltender to capture the honor, and Kelli Stack led the CWHL in scoring, the first American-born player to win the Angela James Bowl.

Räty was also the starting goaltender for the Red Star in the 2018 Clarkson Cup finals in Toronto. Facing the Markham Thunder, the final went into overtime, where Laura Stacey scored with 2:11 left in the 4-on-4 overtime as Markham prevailed by a 2–1 score for its first Clarkson Cup win. Räty recorded 37 saves in the game while Stack scored the only goal of the game for the Red Star. Head coach Digit Murphy left the team in May and Kunlun Red Star named Bob Deraney, formerly the head coach of the Providence Friars women's ice hockey team, as the new head coach on 12 June 2018.

Prior to the 2018–19 season, the CWHL shut down the other Chinese team, the Vanke Rays. On 3 August 2018, Kunlun Red Star changed its name to Shenzhen KRS Vanke Rays. Rob Morgan, who served as the head coach of the Vanke Rays during its only season was named as the general manager for the consolidated club. Kunlun Red Star brand was continued to be used by a separate hockey team for the Chinese national players as part of the national team's development in preparation for the 2022 Winter Olympics.

In February 2019, the KRS Vanke Rays announced coach Deraney had stepped down and Mike LaZazzera would take over the rest of the season. The team missed qualifying for the final playoff spot via tiebreaker with the Toronto Furies.

Following the season, the CWHL ceased operations citing the financial infeasibility of the league, but that the Chinese partnership had kept the league operating during the previous seasons.

Zhenskaya Hockey League (ZhHL): 2019–present 
On 25 July 2019, the team announced they were joining the Zhenskaya Hockey League (ZhHL) for the 2019–20 season. The team hired former North Dakota head coach Brian Idalski, the team's fourth head coach, while retaining veteran players Carpenter, Räty and Rachel Llanes. In their first season in the ZhHL, the Vanke Rays finished second overall in the regular-season table behind HC Agidel Ufa. In the playoff round, the Vanke Rays swept their playoff games against HC Tornado and Agidel to win the ZhHL Cup, becoming the first non-Russian team to win the ZhHL championship. In addition, Carpenter was named the league's scoring champion of 2020. 

In response to heightened entry restrictions in Russia amid the COVID-19 pandemic, the team temporarily relocated to Stupino, a Russian town in Moscow Oblast, for the 2020–21 season. While in Stupino, the team's temporary home arena was the Ice Palace V. M. Bobrova, which they shared with Kapitan Stupino of the Junior Hockey League (MHL). 

They remained in Moscow Oblast for the 2021–22 ZhHL season, relocating to Mytishchi Arena in Mytishchi.

Players and personnel

2022–23 roster

Note: Player names are displayed using western name order (given name, then family name) to preserve the sorting function of the table.  

Coaching staff and team personnel
 Head coach: Scott Spencer
 Assistant coach: Myles Fitzgerald
 Assistant coach: Alexander Petrov
 Video coach: Igor Gorbenko

Front office
 General manager: Nursultan Otorbaev
 Sporting director: Melanie Jue
 President: Ao Meng

Team captaincy history 
 Qi Xueting, 2019–20
 Alex Carpenter, 2020–21
 Yu Baiwei, 2021–

Head coaches 
 Digit Murphy, 2017–18
 Bob Deraney, June 2018–February 2019
 Mike LaZazzera, February 2019–March 2019
 Brian Idalski, 2019–2022
 Scott Spencer, 2022–

Awards and honours
Noora Räty, 2018 CWHL Goaltender of the Year
Kelli Stack, 2018 Angela James Bowl
Kelli Stack, 2018 CWHL Most Valuable Player
Alex Carpenter, 2020 ZhHL Top Scorer

References

External links
 Official site (in Russian)

 
Women's ice hockey teams in Asia
HC Kunlun Red Star
Ice hockey clubs established in 2017
2017 establishments in China
Women's ice hockey in China
Ice hockey teams in China
Women's ice hockey in Russia
Zhenskaya Hockey League teams
Sport in Shenzhen
Canadian Women's Hockey League teams